Sagaz-e Mobarakabad (also Romanized as Sagāz-e Mobārakābād; also known as Sagāz, Sagoz, and Sagūz) is a village in Cham Chamal Rural District, Bisotun District, Harsin County, Kermanshah Province, Iran. At the 2006 census, its population was 470, in 106 families.

References 

Populated places in Harsin County